Lauren Marie Boyle  (born 14 December 1987) is a former competitive swimmer from New Zealand.  She has competed at three Commonwealth Games and three Olympic Games.

Career
Boyle won a bronze medal with Helen Norfolk, Alison Fitch and Melissa Ingram in the 4 × 200 m freestyle relay at the 2006 Commonwealth Games.

At the 2008 Olympic Games she was a member of the New Zealand 4 × 200 m freestyle relay team which was disqualified in the heats.

She won a silver medal with Penelope Marshall, Amaka Gessler and Natasha Hind in the 4 × 200 m freestyle relay at the 2010 Commonwealth Games.

At the 2012 Olympics in London, Boyle was fourth fastest in the heats of the 400m freestyle in a New Zealand record 4:03.63. In the final she finished 8th. In the 800m heats she swam 8:25.91, also a New Zealand record, qualifying fifth fastest for the final. In the final she swam another record of 8:22.72 to finish fourth, 2.40 seconds from the bronze medal which went to defending champion and world record holder Rebecca Adlington.

In August 2013, Boyle claimed three medals at the FINA World Swimming Championships in Barcelona, becoming only the second New Zealander to achieve this feat (after Danyon Loader in 1994).

At the 2014 Commonwealth Games, Boyle won gold in the 400m freestyle and a silver medal in the 800m freestyle. She also finished fourth in the final of the 200m freestyle after breaking the New Zealand record in the heats. In the 400 m freestyle, she set a new Games record in the final.

At the Wellington Winter Short Course meet in August 2014 Boyle broke the World Short Course record in the women's 1500m freestyle with a time of 15:22.68.

At the 2016 Summer Olympics, Boyle was 14th fastest in the semi-finals of the 400 m freestyle, and did not make the final. In the 800 m freestyle, she was 0.29 of a second off making the final.

Boyle is a graduate of the University of California, Berkeley. She announced her retirement from competitive swimming on 1 August 2017 due to ongoing injury problems.

In the 2020 New Year Honours, Boyle was appointed a Member of the New Zealand Order of Merit, for services to swimming.

See also
 List of World Aquatics Championships medalists in swimming (women)
 List of Commonwealth Games medallists in swimming (women)
 World record progression 1500 metres freestyle

References

External links

 
 

1987 births
Living people
California Golden Bears women's swimmers
Commonwealth Games bronze medallists for New Zealand
Commonwealth Games gold medallists for New Zealand
Commonwealth Games silver medallists for New Zealand
Medalists at the FINA World Swimming Championships (25 m)
New Zealand female swimmers
Olympic swimmers of New Zealand
Swimmers from Auckland
Swimmers at the 2008 Summer Olympics
Swimmers at the 2012 Summer Olympics
Swimmers at the 2006 Commonwealth Games
Swimmers at the 2010 Commonwealth Games
Swimmers at the 2014 Commonwealth Games
World Aquatics Championships medalists in swimming
Swimmers at the 2016 Summer Olympics
Commonwealth Games medallists in swimming
Universiade medalists in swimming
Universiade gold medalists for New Zealand
Universiade silver medalists for New Zealand
Universiade bronze medalists for New Zealand
Members of the New Zealand Order of Merit
Medalists at the 2011 Summer Universiade
Medallists at the 2006 Commonwealth Games
Medallists at the 2010 Commonwealth Games
Medallists at the 2014 Commonwealth Games